Jemadar Nand Singh, VC, MVC (24 September 1914 – 12 December 1947) was an Indian recipient of the Victoria Cross, the highest and most prestigious award for gallantry in the face of the enemy that can be awarded to British and Commonwealth forces and he was posthumously awarded the Maha Vir Chakra (MVC), the second-highest Indian decoration for battlefield gallantry. This makes Nand Singh unique in the annals of VC winners.

Military career

World War II
He was 29 years old, and an Acting Naik in the 1/11th Sikh Regiment, in the Indian Army during World War II when the following deed took place for which he was awarded the VC.

On 11/12 March 1944 on the Maungdaw-Buthidaung Road, Burma (now Myanmar), Naik Nand Singh, commanding a leading section of the attack, was ordered to recapture a position gained by the enemy.  He led his section up a very steep knife-edged ridge under very heavy machine-gun and rifle fire and although wounded in the thigh, captured the first trench.  He then crawled forward alone and, wounded again in the face and shoulder, nevertheless captured the second and third trenches.

Indo-Pakistan War
He later achieved the rank of Jemadar in the post-independence Indian Army, and his unit 1 Sikh was the first to be involved in the Jammu & Kashmir Operations or Indo-Pakistani War of 1947 which began in October 1947 as Indian troops went into action to repel a planned invasion of J&K by raiders from Pakistan.

On 12 December 1947 Nand Singh led his platoon of D Coy in a desperate but successful attack to extricate his battalion from an ambush in the hills SE of Uri in Kashmir. He was mortally injured by a close-quarters machine-gun burst, and posthumously awarded the Maha Vir Chakra (MVC), the second-highest Indian decoration for battlefield gallantry.  This makes Nand Singh unique in the annals of VC winners.

The Pakistanis recognised Jemadar Nand Singh because of his VC ribbon. His body was taken Muzaffarabad where it was tied spreadeagled on a truck and paraded through the city with a loudspeaker proclaiming that this would be the fate of every Indian VC. The soldier's body was later thrown into a garbage dump, and was never recovered.

Citations

Victoria Cross
The Victoria Cross citation reads as follows:

Maha Vir Chakra

The citation for the Maha Vir Chakra reads as follows:

Legacy
Nand Singh belonged to Village Bahadurpur now in Mansa district, Punjab. The nearest town to his village is Bareta, where a local bus stand is named as Shaheed Nand Singh Viktoria Bus Stand.  A statue in Bathinda (locally known as Fauji Chowk) stands as a memorial.

References

 History of Operations in Jammu & Kashmir 1947-48 by Ministry of Defence, Govt. of India, New Delhi 1987

1914 births
1947 deaths
Sikh warriors
Punjabi people
Indian World War II recipients of the Victoria Cross
British Indian Army soldiers
Indian military personnel killed in action
Recipients of the Maha Vir Chakra
Indian Army officers
People of the Indo-Pakistani War of 1947
People from Mansa district, India